Kate ("Tiki") Barber (born November 22, 1976 in West Chester, Pennsylvania) is a field hockey forward and midfield player from the United States, who made her international senior debut for the Women's National Team in 1998 by scoring two goals in a 3-3 draw with New Zealand. The former student of Unionville High School and the University of North Carolina at Chapel Hill was a member of the team, that won the silver medal at the 1999 Pan American Games in Winnipeg, Manitoba, Canada.

She was the captain of the American field hockey team which competed in the 2008 Summer Olympics.  It was the first Olympics for which the United States had qualified since the 1996 Summer Olympics.

She was once interviewed on the NBC Today Show by American football player, Tiki Barber, where it was revealed that she received her nickname "Tiki" because of his nickname.  They were contemporary athletes in the Atlantic Coast Conference.  Since he was a headlining football player at the University of Virginia at the time of her success at the University of North Carolina, her teammates began calling her "Tiki" as well.  The nickname persisted into her international career.

International Senior Tournaments
 1998 – World Cup, Utrecht, The Netherlands (8th)
 1999 – Pan American Games, Winnipeg, Canada (2nd)
 2000 – Olympic Qualifying Tournament, Milton Keynes, England (6th)
 2001 – Pan American Cup, Kingston, Jamaica (2nd)
 2002 – Champions Challenge, Johannesburg, South Africa (5th)
 2002 – USA vs India WC Qualifying Series, Cannock, England (1st)
 2002 – World Cup, Perth, Australia (9th)
 2003 – Champions Challenge, Catania, Italy (5th)
 2003 – Pan American Games, Santo Domingo, Dominican Republic (2nd)
 2004 – Olympic Qualifying Tournament, Auckland, New Zealand (6th)
 2004 – Pan American Cup, Bridgetown, Barbados (2nd)
 2005 – Champions Challenge, Virginia Beach, United States (5th)
 2006 – World Cup Qualifier, Rome, Italy (4th)
 2006 – World Cup, Madrid, Spain (6th)
 2007 – Pan American Games, Rio de Janeiro (2nd)
 2008 – 2008 Summer Olympics, Beijing, China (8th)

References

External links
 

1976 births
Living people
People from West Chester, Pennsylvania
American female field hockey players
Sportspeople from Pennsylvania
North Carolina Tar Heels field hockey players
Field hockey players at the 2007 Pan American Games
Field hockey players at the 2008 Summer Olympics
Olympic field hockey players of the United States
Pan American Games silver medalists for the United States
Pan American Games medalists in field hockey
Female field hockey midfielders
Female field hockey forwards
Medalists at the 2007 Pan American Games
21st-century American women